State Geologic and Subsoil Survey of Ukraine or  Ukrainian Geological Survey (UGS),  is the National Upstream Regulator that  issues exploration and production licenses for all mineral resources, supervises their performance, and carries out geologic assessments across the country.

They serve as a agrologist studying group for any ground. However, during the Ukraine War, they have ceased many operations.

External links 
 Official webbsite of UGS

Sources 

Ukraine
Government bodies